Jason Alexander Hewett (born 17 October 1968) is a former New Zealand rugby union player. A halfback, Hewett represented Manawatu and Auckland at domestic level. He was a member of the New Zealand national side, the All Blacks, in 1991, playing one international against Italy.

References

1968 births
Living people
People from Clyde, New Zealand
People educated at Freyberg High School
Massey University alumni
Rugby union scrum-halves
New Zealand rugby union players
New Zealand international rugby union players
Manawatu rugby union players
Auckland rugby union players
New Zealand expatriate rugby union players
Expatriate rugby union players in Japan
New Zealand expatriate sportspeople in Japan
Expatriate rugby union players in Scotland
New Zealand expatriate sportspeople in Scotland
Dundee HSFP players
New Zealand rugby union coaches